Henryk Bożek (26 August 1924 – 25 December 1994) was a Polish footballer. He played in two matches for the Poland national football team in 1950.

References

External links
 
 

1924 births
1994 deaths
Polish footballers
Poland international footballers
People from Mysłowice
Association football forwards
Garbarnia Kraków players